Rogers Morgan Govender MBE (born 29 June 1960) is a South African Anglican priest. Since 2006, he has been Dean of Manchester. He is a sixth generation South African.

Early life
Govender was born on 29 June 1960 in Durban, Province of Natal, South Africa. He is a sixth generation South African of South Indian ancestry. In 1983, he entered St Paul's College, Grahamstown, an Anglican theological college, to train for ministry in the Church of the Province of Southern Africa.

Ordained ministry
Govender was ordained deacon in 1985 and priest in 1986. He was priest in charge at St Mary's Church, Greyville, Durban from 1988 until 1993 when he was transferred to St Matthew's Hayfields, Pietermaritzburg where he was rector and subsequently St Thomas's Musgrave Road. He graduated from the University of Natal with a Bachelor of Theology (BTh) degree in 1997. He emigrated to the United Kingdom in 2002 after 15 years of service in the Diocese of Natal.

On arrival in England, he was priest-in-charge of Christ Church, West Didsbury in South Manchester and Area Dean of Withington. In 2006 he was appointed Dean of Manchester. The Dean is based in Manchester, England and is the head of the Chapter of Manchester Cathedral. At the time of his appointment was England's first black cathedral dean, and the third most senior black or Asian churchman in the Church of England.  His aim is to accommodate people of all races in the inner city.

Govender filled in for Tom Hanks in a spoofed Da Vinci Code movie poster in 2006, to promote a "Da Vinci Code Mass" at the cathedral intended to address issues raised by the controversial book, and the movie based on it.  The mass was inspired by a poll revealing that the book and movie may have undermined public trust in the Catholic Church.

Personal life
Govender is married to Celia. They have two children, Jonathan and Claire.

Honours
In 2018 Govender was awarded an MBE for his services to interfaith relations and to the community in Manchester.

See also
 Controversy over the use of Manchester Cathedral in Resistance: Fall of Man

References

External links
 Manchester Cathedral website
 2005 Natal Anglican News, citing Rogers' appointment to Dean
 Spero news, citing the "Da Vinci Code" poster spoof

1960 births
Living people
Deans of Manchester
20th-century South African Anglican priests
South African people of Indian descent
University of Natal alumni
Members of the Order of the British Empire
21st-century English Anglican priests